Arlington is a village in Bureau County, Illinois, United States. The population was 169 at the 2020 census. It is part of the Ottawa Micropolitan Statistical Area, located east of the Quad Cities, north of Peoria and Galesburg, west of LaSalle and Peru, and southwest of Rockford and Chicago.

History
In the early 1900s, Arlington, which was then called "Lost Grove", was experiencing rapid growth and development. Many companies set up shop to profit from the people flocking to the jobs at the coal mines in this area of Illinois. The businesses included a mattress factory, beer brewery, numerous restaurants, a brothel, and many others. The mayor at the time was from New York, and changed the town's name to Arlington, after the town of Arlington, New York. Arlington was about the size of Peru, Illinois.

On November 13, 1909, a fire in a mine shaft killed 259 miners, young and old, at the Cherry coal mine. Authorities sealed the mine to contain the fire, trapping many rescue workers inside. When the mine was opened a week later only twenty men had survived of the hundreds involved. The 1909 Cherry Mine disaster influenced early workers' compensation laws and labor practices in the coal mining industry. At the time Illinois had no laws governing working conditions for miners. Arlington's growth slowed drastically after this occurrence.

In the 1950s a tornado destroyed most of Arlington. Many people moved away from the town at this time. Today Arlington has a population of less than 200. Many of the businesses and most of the homes have been shut down, deserted, or demolished. Many areas previously inhabited are now corn and bean fields. Some of the abandoned homes' foundations, and evidence of their former occupants, are still visible in these fields.

Geography
Arlington is located at  (41.472353, -89.246989).

Demographics

As of the 2020 census there were 169 people, 76 households, and 61 families residing in the village. The racial makeup of the village was 94.67% White, 0.59% African American, 0.59% Asian, and 4.14% from two or more races. Hispanic or Latino of any race were 1.18% of the population.

There were 76 households, out of which 44.74% had children under the age of 18 living with them, 68.42% were married couples living together, 11.84% had a female householder with no husband present, and 19.74% were non-families. 17.11% of all households were made up of individuals, and 6.58% had someone living alone who was 65 years of age or older. The average household size was 3.15 and the average family size was 2.78.

The village's age distribution consisted of 17.5% under the age of 18, 6.6% from 18 to 24, 23.2% from 25 to 44, 38.9% from 45 to 64, and 13.7% who were 65 years of age or older. The median age was 46.5 years. For every 100 females, there were 106.9 males. For every 100 females age 18 and over, there were 97.7 males.

The median income for a household in the village was $73,750, and the median income for a family was $83,750. Males had a median income of $41,250 versus $25,833 for females. The per capita income for the village was $28,693. About 9.8% of families and 7.6% of the population were below the poverty line, including 8.1% of those under age 18 and 0.0% of those age 65 or over.

Notable person

Mike Prendergast, major league baseball player
Albert B. Wolfe, economist

References

External links
 "Arlington is a village in Bureau County, Illinois, United States"

Villages in Bureau County, Illinois
Villages in Illinois
Ottawa, IL Micropolitan Statistical Area